Hard Road may refer to:

Music

Albums
Hard Road, a 2001 album by the 2nd South Carolina String Band
Hard Road (Stevie Wright album), 1974
A Hard Road, a 1967 album by John Mayall and the Bluesbreakers
The Hard Road, a 2006 album by the Australian group Hilltop Hoods

Songs
"The Hard Road" (song), a 2006 single by Hilltop Hoods
"Hard Road", 1978 song by Black Sabbath from Never Say Die!
"Hard Road", song by Sam Roberts from his 2003 album We Were Born in a Flame
"Hard Road", U.S. title of "Wring That Neck", song by Deep Purple from their 1968 album The Book of Taliesyn
"Hard Road," a song by Labi Siffre 1987
"Hard Road," a song by Zingaro (singer)	1978
"Hard Road," a song by Brownstone (group), Gisonno, Hofman, Seiberg 1973
"Hard Road," a song by Lake (German band), 1979
"Hard Road," a song by The Shore (band)